HMS Untiring (P59) was a Royal Navy U-class submarine built by Vickers-Armstrong.  So far she has been the only ship of the Royal Navy to bear the name Untiring. After the war, she was loaned to the Greek Navy and renamed Xifias (Y-10).

Wartime career
After a work up patrol off the Norwegian coast, where she sank the Norwegian fishing vessel Havbris I whilst she was fishing for halibut, Untiring was assigned to operate in the Mediterranean. Here, she went on to sink the German netlayer Netztender 44/Prudente, the German barge F 296, the German ships Jean Suzon/FP 352 and St. Antoine/FP 358, the German auxiliary minesweeper M 6022/Enseigne, the German merchants Diana and Siena (the former French Astrée), the German auxiliary submarine chasers UJ 6075 / Clairvoyant and UJ 6078/La Havraise, and also claimed to have sunk a sailing vessel with gunfire.

She also unsuccessfully attacked the German submarine U-616, the German auxiliary submarine chaser UJ 6073/Nimeth Allah, the German torpedo boat TA18 (the former Italian Solferino), the German merchant Burgas and an unidentified German auxiliary patrol vessel.

Greek service

Untiring survived the war and was loaned to the Greek Navy in July 1945, where she was renamed Xifias.  She served with the Greek Navy for seven years, and was returned to the Royal Navy in 1952. She was subsequently sunk as an ASDIC target on 25 July 1957.

References

 
 
 

 

British U-class submarines
Ships built on the River Tyne
1943 ships
World War II submarines of the United Kingdom
British U-class submarines of the Hellenic Navy
Ships built by Vickers Armstrong